Charles Webster, FBA, is a historian and retired academic specialising in the history of medicine and science. He was Reader in the History of Medicine and Director of the Wellcome Unit for the History of Medicine at the University of Oxford from 1972 to 1988 (when he was also a fellow of Corpus Christi College, Oxford), and a senior research fellow at All Souls College, Oxford, from 1988 to 2004. Webster was elected a Fellow of the British Academy in 1982.

Publications 
 Samuel Hartlib and the Advancement of Learning (Cambridge: Cambridge University Press, 1972).
 From Paracelsus to Newton: Magic and the Making of Modern Science (Cambridge: Cambridge University Press, 1982).
 Problems of Health Care: The National Health Service before 1957 (London: Her Majesty's Stationery Office, 1988).
 Government and Health Care: The British National Health Service 1958–1979 (London: Her Majesty's Stationery Office, 1996).
 The Great Instauration, 2nd edn. (Oxford: Peter Lang, 2002).
 The National Health Service: A Political History, 2nd edn. (Oxford: Oxford University Press, 2002).
 Paracelsus: Medicine, Magic and Mission at the End of Time (New Haven: Yale University Press, 2008).

References 

Living people
Year of birth missing (living people)
Academics of the University of Oxford
Fellows of Corpus Christi College, Oxford
Fellows of All Souls College, Oxford
Fellows of the British Academy
British medical historians